Pavel Pavlov may refer to:

 Pavel Pavlov (actor) (1885–1974), Russian actor
 Pavel Pavlov (sailor), Russian Olympic sailor
 Pavel Pavlov (sprinter) (1952–2004), Bulgarian Olympic sprinter
 Pavel Pavlov (wrestler) (born 1953), Bulgarian Greco-Roman wrestler and Olympic medalist